Canarium pseudopatentinervium is a plant in the incense tree family Burseraceae. The specific epithet  is from the Latin meaning "false patentinervium", referring to the species' resemblance to Canarium patentinervium.

Description
Its yellow-brown bark is scaly to dimpled. The twigs are whitish.

Distribution and habitat
Canarium pseudopatentinervium grows naturally in Sumatra and Borneo. Its habitat is lowland forests at around  altitude.

References

pseudopatentinervium
Trees of Sumatra
Trees of Borneo
Plants described in 1932
Taxonomy articles created by Polbot